The 1984 Dora Mavor Moore Awards celebrated excellence in theatre from the Toronto Alliance for the Performing Arts.

Winners and nominees

General Theatre Division

Musical Theatre or Revue Division

Independent Theatre Division

Theatre for Young Audiences Division

See also
38th Tony Awards
1984 Laurence Olivier Awards

References

1984 in Toronto
Dora Awards, 1984
Dora Mavor Moore Awards ceremonies